Microodes is a genus of beetles in the family Carabidae, containing the following species:

 Microodes altostriatus Lecordier & Girard, 1987 
 Microodes artus Lecordier, 1990 
 Microodes decorsei (Alluaud, 1936) 
 Microodes deflexus Lecordier & Girard, 1987 
 Microodes mirei Lecordier & Girard, 1987 
 Microodes nanus (Peringuey, 1896)

References

Licininae